Burg (also known as Burg bei Magdeburg to distinguish from other places with the same name) is a town of about 22,400 inhabitants on the Elbe–Havel Canal in northeastern Germany,  northeast of Magdeburg. It is the capital of the Jerichower Land district in the state of Saxony-Anhalt.

The town is known for its mediaeval churches and towers. Due to the numerous towers and steeples Burg also carries the sobriquet City of Towers. Like other German towns and cities, Burg shows its connection to the Roland saga with a statue, which was restored in 1999.

Etymology

Although the name Burg has the same form as the German word Burg (castle), it is more likely that the name comes from the Slavic word bor, meaning coniferous forest.

Subdivisions
The municipality Burg bei Magdeburg consists of the town Burg bei Magdeburg and the formerly independent municipalities Detershagen, Ihleburg, Niegripp, Parchau, Schartau and Reesen.

Economy
Burg formerly had the largest shoe manufacturing factory in Europe and was the first to produce manufactured crispbread in Germany, beginning production in 1931.

Twin towns – sister cities

Burg is twinned with:
 Afantou, Greece
 Gummersbach, Germany
 La Roche-sur-Yon, France
 Tira, Israel

Notable people

 Heiko Balz (born 1969), wrestler
 Julia Bonk (born 1986), politician (The Left), Member of Landtag (Saxony)
 Joachim a Burck (1546–1610), composer
 Carl von Clausewitz (1780–1831), Prussian general and important military theorist
 Hermann Eggert (1844–1920), architect
 Harald Jährling (born 1954), rower 
 Ferdinand Kurlbaum (1857–1927), physicist
 Hermann Paasche (1851–1925), politician (DVP)
 Emanuel Raasch (born 1955), cyclist
Brigitte Reimann (1933-1973), writer
 Hermann Riedel (1847–1913), composer and conductor
 Wolfgang Seguin (born 1945), footballer

Transmitter
Near Burg there is a large transmission site for long- and mediumwave, which was among other things used for the transmissions of Radio Wolga.

References

External links
http://www.stadt-burg.de
http://www.burgundumgebung.de

Jerichower Land